Statistics of the Scottish Football League in season 1916–17. The competition was won by Celtic by ten points over nearest rival Morton.

League table

Notes

Results

See also
1916–17 in Scottish football

References

 
1916-17